Erol Yesilkaya (born June 6, 1976 in Istanbul) is a Turkish-German screenwriter.

Life and work
Erol Yesilkaya was born in Istanbul, Turkey in 1976 and grew up in Krefeld, Germany. After he finished the Gymnasium and received his Abitur, Yesilkaya worked as a location manager. Then he studied Modern German Literature and Media Studies at the University of Marburg. During his studies, Yesilkaya was involved in many film and cultural projects as a promoter, organizer or projectionist and filmed various short film scripts, many of which were his own works.

After successfully completing his studies in Marburg in 2004, Yesilkaya moved to Hamburg, where he wrote his first screenplay. Since 2008 Yesilkaya lives and works in Berlin. There, he is part of a authors' collective named Schreibkombinat Kurt Klinke. As a member of the collective, Yesilkaya has written various episodes for police crime drama series such as Tatort among others. In addition, he has also written screenplays for popular drama and television series such as Dogs of Berlin, Sløborn, Hausen and Notruf Hafenkante.

The Tatort episodes, which were made in collaboration with the German film director Sebastian Marka were almost all praised by the German press and received good IMDb ratings. In addition, some of the crime scene episodes for which Yesilkaya wrote the scripts won German and international awards. For example, the Tatort - episodes Die Wahrheit and Long Live Death (Es lebe der Tod) were nominated for the German Television Crime Award in 2017 and the episode Das Nest in 2020. The Tatort-episode Long Live Death had its international premiere at the Austin Film Festival in 2016, where Yesilkaya was nominated for an audience award. It was also screened at the Garden State Film Festival, the Nashville Film Festival and the St. Louis International Film Festival. Then, Yesilkaya and Marka were nominated for the prestigious German Grimme Award (Grimme-Preis) in 2017 for their Tatort - episode Die Wahrheit. They received it two years later for their Tatort-episode Meta.

Yesilkaya and Marka had met in 2012 and worked together nine times so far. In an interview with the German trade magazine Blickpunkt:Film, Marka compares their cooperation to the "showrunner - principle". During the process of making a film, from idea development to film editing, Yesilkaya and Marka would be in constant exchange of information to achieve a good result.

On October 20, 2020, the dystopian TV - Science fiction film Exit was broadcast on the nationwide German television channel Das Erste. For the film, Yesilkaya wrote the script and Marka directed again. It is set in the year 2047 and addresses the dimension and impact of artificial intelligence and digital life. The German film critic Arno Frank of Spiegel Online said, that a "perfectly formed dystopia like "Exit" [...] has not yet been seen on public television" in Germany. (Eine formvollendete Dystopie wie "Exit" [...] hat man bei den Öffentlich-Rechtlichen noch nicht gesehen.)

It was announced in the press on February 2, 2021, that Marka and Yesilkaya are to film the German fantasy novel - bestseller The Gryphon (Der Greif, 1989) by Wolfgang Hohlbein as a series for Amazon Prime Video. The Gryphon is scheduled for release in 2023.

Filmography 
 2008:  (TV movie)
 2010: Gonger II (TV movie)
 2012: Die 13. Wahrheit - Uwe Ochsenknecht erzählt (TV series)
 2014: Tatort - Alle meine Jungs (TV series)
 2015: Tatort - Das Haus am Ende der Straße (TV series)
 2015: Tatort - Hinter dem Spiegel (TV series)
 2016: Tatort - Die Wahrheit (TV series)
 2016: Long Live Death (Tatort - Es lebe der Tod), (TV series)
 2016: Tatort - Die Wahrheit (TV series)
 2017: Tatort - Der Tod ist unser ganzes Leben (TV series)
 2018: Tatort - Meta (TV series)
 2018: Dogs of Berlin (episode Begegnung), (drama series)
 2018: Tatort - Wer jetzt allein ist (TV series)
 2019: Notruf Hafenkante (6 episodes from 2015 to 2019), (TV series)
 2019: Tatort - Ein Tag wie jeder andere (TV series)
 2019: Tatort - Das Nest (TV series)
 2020: Hausen (episodes Juris Reise  and Hausregeln), (TV series)
 2020: Tatort - Parasomnia (TV series)
 2020: Exit (TV movie)
 2022: Souls (TV series)
 2022: Tatort - Das Opfer (TV series)

Awards and nominations 
Austin Film Festival 2016
 Nomination for the Audience award in the category Stories from Abroad for Long Live Death

Grimme-Preis 2017
 Nomination for the Grimme-Preis together with Sebastian Marka (director) in the category Fiction for Tatort: Die Wahrheit

Grimme-Preis 2019
 Grimme-Preis (Grimme-Award) for Erol Yesilkaya (screenplay) und Sebastian Marka (director) in the category Outstanding Individual Achievement - Fiction for the Tatort: Meta

Canneseries 2022
 Prize Best Screenplay for Erol Yesilkaya (screenplay), Alex Eslam (Creator), Lisa van Brakel (screenplay) and Senad Halilbasic (screenplay) for Souls

References

External links 
 

1976 births
Turkish emigrants to West Germany
Living people
Mass media people from North Rhine-Westphalia
German screenwriters
German male screenwriters
People from Krefeld